Noel and Mary is an Australian television chat show which aired 1967 on Melbourne station ATV-0 (later ATV-10 and part of Network Ten). This daytime show was hosted by Noel Ferrier and Mary Hardy, and featured interviews. 

The series aired in a 25-minute time-slot. It was part of five new programmes which debuted on ATV-0 around the same time. The others were Pied Piper, Gordon and the Girls, Off to the Races and Take a Letter.

References

External links
Noel and Mary

1967 Australian television series debuts
1967 Australian television series endings
Black-and-white Australian television shows
English-language television shows
Network 10 original programming
Australian television talk shows